Bretteville-sur-Odon (literally Bretteville on Odon) is a commune in the department of Calvados in the Normandy region in northwestern France.

Population

Twin towns
 Woodbury, Devon, UK since 1978
 Glattbach, Germany since 1987
 Ouonck CR, Sénégal since 1997

See also
Communes of the Calvados department

References

Communes of Calvados (department)
Calvados communes articles needing translation from French Wikipedia